Marikina, officially the City of Marikina, is a 1st class highly urbanized city in the National Capital Region of the Philippines. According to the 2020 census, it has a population of 456,159 people.

It is located along the eastern border of Metro Manila, Marikina is the main gateway of Metro Manila to Rizal and Quezon provinces through Marikina–Infanta Highway. It is bordered on the west by Quezon City, to the south by Pasig and Cainta, to the north by San Mateo, and to the east by Antipolo, the capital of Rizal province.

It was founded by the Jesuits on the fertile Marikina Valley in 1630. Marikina was the provincial capital of the Province of Manila under the First Philippine Republic from 1898 to 1899 during the Philippine Revolution. Following the onset of American occupation it was then organized as a municipality of Rizal Province, prior to the formation of Metro Manila in 1975. Formerly a rural settlement, Marikina is now primarily residential and industrial and has become increasingly commercial in recent years. The City of Marikina is considered one of the wealthiest local government units in the Philippines.

Marikina is known as the "Shoe Capital of the Philippines" owing to its famous shoe industry. It is the biggest manufacturer of shoes in the Philippines, producing almost 70% of shoes made in the country. Located in the city are the Philippine International Footwear Center and the Shoe Museum, housing the infamous shoe collection of former First Lady Imelda Marcos, wife of the late Filipino president, dictator, and kleptocrat Ferdinand Marcos.

The city is under the jurisdiction of the Roman Catholic Diocese of Antipolo. It contains the Our Lady of the Abandoned Church, the oldest in the Marikina Valley, built in 1572.

Etymology

In view of the non-existence of records or documents on how the name Marikina came into being, the following legends were gathered from elder residents of the different barrios in Marikina.
One of the builders of the Jesús de la Peña Chapel was a young priest named "Mariquina", who was given the task of baptizing children to Christianity. Because of this very noble job, Mariquina was named in his honor.
It is said that before the Spaniards came to Mariquina, a beautiful, virtuous, polite, and intelligent lady named Maria Cuina was residing in the town. Because of her expertise in business, she became wealthy, and her fortunes were expended on charity. She eventually became famous in the whole town up to Manila.
Construction of the chapel of Jesús de la Peña was supervised by a Jesuit priest, and the laborers were Filipinos. As expected, the language barrier resulted in the usual misunderstandings. When the chapel was completed and the priest asked what the structure would be called, one worker answered "Marikit-na-Po", thinking that what was being asked was the condition of the chapel. 
In the province of Viscaya in Spain, there was a beautiful town called Mariquina. The town, located beside the Charmaga River (now known as Artibai River), is the origin of the Jesuit priests who came to the Philippines and established Jesús de la Peña. Because of this, "Mariquina" was used to honor the place where they came from. In 1901, Commissioner de Tavera changed the letter "q" to "k".
Based on history and documents in the custody of the municipal government of Marikina, the town was called Marikit-na in 1787 and was later changed to Mariquina. According to Dr. Trinidad Pardo de Tavera, the word Mariquina was in recognition of Capt. Berenguer de Marquina who led the town in 1788.

History

Early history

The Augustinians were the first to arrive at the valley in the 1500s, at the spot known as Chorillo in Barangka. In 1572, Our Lady of the Abandoned Parish was established. Next came the Jesuits in 1630, in a place now called Jesús de la Peña (Jesus of the Rocks). Here, the Jesuits established a mission and built a chapel still known today as Jesús de la Pena Chapel. Fray Pedro de Arce, apostolic ruler of the Archbishop of Manila at that time, approved transfer of ecclesiastical control and supervision to the Jesuits, and settled the place as a town.

In 1665, an intensity 8 earthquake struck the valley and nearby Manila, and it is related to the activity now known as Marikina Valley Fault System. Only a Jesuit church experienced great damage and resulting in 19 deaths in the said earthquake.

In 1787, the town was called "Mariquina" after Felix Berenguer de Marquina, who was the governor-general at that time, and the town was declared a pueblo under the Spanish colonial government.

Marikina was once the Hacienda Sauza-Berenguer de Marquina (1809–1870), the land and home was formerly owned by Don Santiago Sauza y Delos Rios (1777–1880) and his wife Dona Ysabel Berenguer de Marquina y Sumulong (1790–1900). Moreover, Doña Ysabel Berenguer de Marquina y Sumulong (November 19, 1790, Cagsawa, Daraga,  Albay, Philippines – January 30, 1900, Banwa, Batan, Aklan, Philippines) was the only daughter of Doña Demetria Sumulong y Lindo and of Señor Felix Berenguer de Marquina y FitzGerald, the former Governor-General of the Philippines. By the 19th century, Hacienda Mariquina was eventually owned and administered by the Tuason family and had become the largest in the Philippines. The hacienda was declared a mayorazgo by the Spanish colonial government. Don Juan Gregorio became the first Alcalde Capitan of Mariquina in 1822.

During the Philippine Revolution in 1896, Andrés Bonifacio arrived in Mariquina before he and his Katipuneros proceeded to the caves of Montalban. Mariquina became the capital of the Province of Manila in 1898, when the Philippine Revolution broke out, a period when Philippine Independence was declared by Emilio Aguinaldo, the first Philippine president. Don Vicente Gomez became the first Alcalde Presidente of Mariquina in 1900.

20th century
On June 11, 1901, shortly after the United States took possession of the Philippines, its name officially became "Marikina". The province of Rizal was created by virtue of Act No. 137 by the First Philippine Commission which was acting as the unicameral legislative body in the island of Luzon. Marikina, along with many other towns around Manila, was incorporated into the new province.

In 1906, the Manila Railroad Company completed a  steam train line called "Marikina Line", also known as Rosario-Montalban branch, a branch of Philippine National Railway which is currently existing (converted into the road which is known today as Daang Bakal, including Shoe Avenue), Marikina Railway Depot (Marikina Elementary School in the present-day) and Marikina Railway Station, connecting Montalban and Rosario (known today as Tramo, in Pasig). Marikina Bridge, a vital economic link to Manila, was formally opened in 1934. During the construction of the train line, not far from Marikina Railway Depot, Marikina Airfield was completed and used for the civilian airfield. The runways were subsequently converted into the road known today as E. Rodriguez Avenue and E. Santos Streets, and the airfield stands today as Paliparan Subdivision. In 1936, the Marikina Line was abandoned.

In 1939, the barrios of Balara, Barranca (Barangka), Jesus de la Peña, Krus na Ligas, Tañong, and the site of the new UP Campus were separated from Marikina to form part of the newly established Quezon City. In 1941, the barrios of lower Barranca and Jesus de la Peña were returned to Marikina.

In 1942, during the World War II, Japanese Imperial forces occupied Marikina. The town was liberated in 1945 by combined United States and Philippine Commonwealth ground troops, who attacked the Japanese Imperial Army by artillery from Quezon City. Almost all of the large buildings, including the church bell tower, were destroyed. In reality, the Japanese had already left the town and retreated to the north. The town saw over 400 civilians casualties by the end of World War II. Local Filipino troops under the pre-war 4th and 42nd Infantry Division of the Philippine Commonwealth Army entered Marikina and assisted U.S. forces in attacking Japanese troops during the liberation. The general headquarters of the Philippine Commonwealth Army was rebuilt and stationed in Marikina after the war.

In 1956, Marikina was given the title of "Shoe Capital of the Philippines", has re-emerged as a town of shoemakers after World War II. Honed by years of shoe manufacturing experience, the natives had developed a work ethic that prepared them for the arrival of heavy industries. With the industrial plants came waves of workers who chose to stay, rapidly increasing the population.

In 1968, Kapitan Moy's house (now known as Sentrong Pangkultura ng Marikina) was declared a national shrine by the town council and the National Historical Commission. In 1969, Rodriguez Sports Complex, known today as Marikina Sports Center was completed.

On November 7, 1975, by virtue of Presidential Decree No. 824, four cities and thirteen towns of Rizal, including Marikina, were made part of Metropolitan Manila Area. On October 23, 1988, Typhoon Unsang brought heavy rains, causing record flooding in Marikina.

By 1992, Marikina had become an industrialized urban municipality under the leadership of Bayani Fernando. Marikina River was transformed into a waterway, with the Marikina River Park along the riverbanks.

Cityhood

On December 8, 1996, the municipality of Marikina became a city and transformed rapidly into a highly urbanized city. Marikina became a First Class City by virtue of Republic Act No. 8223, the day of the Feast of Immaculate Concepcion, signed by President Fidel V. Ramos.

21st century
In 2006, under Republic Act No. 9364 signed by President Gloria Macapagal Arroyo, Marikina was divided into two congressional districts being served by two representatives in 2007. Barangays Fortune and Tumana were created and became independent in 2007.

On September 26–27, 2009, Marikina was widely devastated by a flash flood from the overflowing Marikina River, due to torrential rains caused by Tropical Storm Ondoy. The river reached the 23-meter mark, the worst flooding in two decades, and the city was declared under a state of calamity. National and international aides arrived immediately for relief, retrieval, and recovery operations. In August 2012, the nonstop eight-day intense monsoon rain caused the Luzon widespread flooding strengthened by Typhoon Gener, which affected the regions of Calabarzon and Metro Manila caused the Marikina River to overflow and destroyed the city.

Geography

Marikina lies on the so-called Marikina Valley, which extends to the south toward Pasig and Cainta, Rizal. Sierra Madre mountains lie to the east and Quezon City hills to the west. Marikina River runs through the mid-west portion of the city, with its tributary including Nangka River. Nangka River runs through the north slicing between Marikina and San Mateo, while the small waterway called Sapang Baho Creek slicing the southeast between Marikina and Cainta and Antipolo.

This represents about 3.42% of the total land area of Metro Manila. At present, the city is composed of 16 barangays. Barangays Fortune, Concepcion Uno, and Marikina Heights are among the largest in terms of land area.

The south portion of the city comprises numerous commercial, industrial and residential areas, heritage sites and mixed use zones, while the north and northeast portion are primarily residential and industrial zones, and various establishments such as small and medium enterprises. Loyola Grand Villas and Trevi Executive Village, located at the northwest portion of the city, are gated communities with upper-middle class and wealthy residents. Barangay Santa Elena represents a poblacion, or the center of Marikina. At present, it is 38% residential, 19% commercial and industrial, 17% Roads, 8% Mixed-use, 18% for parks and open spaces, development areas, institutional, cemeteries and others.

Located along the eastern border of Metro Manila, it is bordered on the west by Quezon City, to the south by Pasig and Cainta, Rizal, to the north by San Mateo, Rizal and to the east by Antipolo, the capital of Rizal province.

From the north, Marikina occupies most of the south bank of Nangka River. The east slices at the foot of the Sierra Madre mountains of Antipolo and sliced by the streets of La Milagrosa Village and Empress 1 Subdivision of Barangay Marikina Heights and Rancho Estate 2 in Barangay Concepcion Dos. A huge hilly lot within streets of Tanguile and Champaca in Marikina Heights proof that the portion is part of Sierra Madre Mountain range. The southeast slices by Sapang Baho River occupies the north-west bank. The south portion is sliced by Marcos Highway and occupies most of the north side of the highway and extends to the west until it occupies the Line 2 Santolan Station depot until it reaches the Marikina River. The east occupies the southernmost of Quezon City hills which lies in Barangay Industrial Valley and sliced by C5 Road occupies the west side until it reaches Ateneo de Manila University campus. The east part of the campus covers the city, extending to the north and sliced by several roads of Loyola Grand Villas, which covers the east part of the village until it reaches Marikina River and its tributary Nangka River to the north.

Marikina River runs to the western part of the city and surrounded by many lush trees in the Marikina River Park on the riverbanks. The south portion of the river is surrounded by structures and concrete walkways. Its depth measures from 12 meters up to 18 meters during the heavy downpour. Rehabilitation of the River started in 1992. The river traverses 11 city barangays which have streets and alleys going to the river, making river parks easily accessible. River parks today are popular sports and recreational centers not only in Metro Manila but throughout the Philippines.

Marikina is also prone to various natural disasters, including the major floodings during the onslaught of Typhoon Unsang in 1988, Typhoon Ondoy in 2009, Tropical Storm Falcon and Typhoon Pedring in 2011, seasonal southwest monsoon in 2012 and 2016, and Typhoon Ulysses in 2020. Primarily, flooding within Marikina is caused by the increase of water level in major rivers and its tributaries from the Sierra Madre mountains, followed by overflowing from its riverbanks to low-lying areas throughout the city.

Another major threat is fault lines in Marikina caused by earthquakes. West Valley Fault Line, previously known as Marikina Fault Line, lies at the west Marikina.

Physiography zones in Marikina

Barangays

Marikina is politically subdivided into 16 barangays. Its barangays are grouped into two districts for city council representation purposes. The first district encompasses the southern section of the city, while the second district encompasses the northern section. Among these barangays, 11 are traversed by Marikina River mostly on the west section of the city.

Climate
Marikina features a tropical monsoon climate. However, humidity levels are usually very high, which makes it feel much warmer. It has a distinct, relatively short dry season from January through May, and a relatively lengthy wet season, from June through December.

Demographics

The native people in Marikina refer to themselves as "Marikeño" (or Marikenyo, in Filipino). According to the 2015 Census, the population of the city was 450,741. The population of Marikina is near half a million, making it one of the most densely populated areas in the Philippines. Like other places in Metro Manila, the original settlers of Marikina were Tagalog. There has been a constant migration of other ethnic groups in the Philippines. Tagalog is widely spoken and the main language in Marikina, while English is used in education and business.

Religion

Marikina was one of the seats of the Spanish colonial government in past centuries and has been used as the base of Roman Catholic missions to the Philippines. Religious orders include the Dominicans, the Franciscans, the Jesuits and the Augustinians, which were the first to arrive in Marikina.

The Our Lady of the Abandoned Church, completed in 1572, is the seat of Nuestra Señora de los Desamparados, the Patron Saint of Marikina. The majority of the city's population is Roman Catholic.

Alternative incarnations of Christianity are promoting their version of faith in the Philippines includes Iglesia ni Cristo, Seventh-day Adventist Church, Members Church of God International, The Church of Jesus Christ of Latter-day Saints, Philippine Independent Church or popularly known as Aglipayan Church, the second-largest catholic denomination in Marikina, and among other small Baptist churches and Christian groups. Pentecostal Missionary Church of Christ (4th Watch) headquarter is located Barangay Sto. Niño. Other small religions in Marikina are Hinduism, Buddhism, Islam, and Sikhism.

Economy
Commercial and industrial

The financial resources of Marikina are scattered all over the city, but the southern part is primarily concentrated which includes business establishments and commercial facilities, while the northern part is factories and warehouses. Riverbanks Center is the city's commercial center situated southwest of the city where shopping malls and recreation areas are located. Real estate, residential condominiums, and commercial establishments along A. Bonifacio Avenue, Marcos Highway, and Sumulong Highway are developing. Restaurants, cafés, diners, and entertainment bars are mostly concentrated along Gil Fernando Avenue, J. P. Rizal Street, Bayanbayanan Avenue, and Lilac Street

Fortune Avenue is home to some of major companies such as Fortune Tobacco, Philip Morris, Armscor and Noritake. Sumulong Highway is the center of business and local trade, and it has mixed establishments such as banking, boutiques, retail shops, electronics, appliances, and other consumer needs. Almost all the major international and local commercial and government banks in the Philippines operate branches in the city.

Shopping centers

SM City Marikina is currently the largest shopping mall in the city, while Riverbanks Center, a community shopping and commercial center is one of the most popular outlet stores in the Philippines. Other shopping malls located in the city are S&R Membership Shopping, Blue Wave Marquinton Mall, Graceland Plaza, C&B Circle Mall, Xeland XentroMall, CitiCentre, and Ayala Malls Marikina while Sienna Towers Residences Shopping Complex is one of the upcoming shopping centers in the city.

Other shopping centers just next to the Marikina boundary are Sta. Lucia East Grand Mall and Robinsons Metro East (near Barangay San Roque), and Ayala Malls Feliz (near Barangay Calumpang), all are located along Marikina-Infanta Highway which of these malls are more closely and accessible to Marikina than to their respective city proper.

Public market

The Marikina Market Mall, a public market in the city is a centralized modern market, converted streets into commercial and market lanes, and is one of the most popular and largest public markets in Metro Manila. The market is divided into two sections: the dry goods and the wet goods. Commerce in this market is active mostly during early mornings and late afternoons. There are also food stalls and eateries located inside the market. Some of Marikina's local products are handicrafts, sweet delicacies, leather, clothing, food processing, bags, accessories, and footwear.

Shoe industry
Marikina is the biggest manufacturer of quality shoes in the Philippines. It is also the Philippines' largest worldwide exporter of leather shoes tagged Marikina as the Shoe Capital of the Philippines. Hundreds of footwear establishments are located throughout the city, generating thousands of jobs and city financial resources that continue to make the shoe and leather industry the top livelihood in the city. By the 2000s, the Marikina shoe industry was affected by competition from Chinese manufacturers.

Government

Local government

Like in other city governments in the Philippines, Marikina is governed by a mayor and a vice mayor elected to three-year terms. The mayor is the executive head and leads the city's departments in executing city ordinances and improving public services, along with city councilors, while the vice mayor heads a legislative council, and these councilors represent the two legislative districts of the city. The council is in charge of formulating and enacting city ordinances.

Marikina, being a part of the Metro Manila region, has its mayor in the Metro Manila Council headed by the Metropolitan Manila Development Authority (MMDA). This council formulates development plans that seek to solve the problems and improve the conditions in the metropolis.

Marikina is made up of 16 barangays that handle governance in a much smaller area. These barangays are grouped into the aforementioned legislative districts. Each district is represented by a congressman, in turn, is represented in the House of Representatives of the Philippines

List of mayors

 Claudio Cruz (1861)
 Vivencio Cruz (1889)
 Remigio Victorino (1893-1894)
 Domingo Victoriano (1895-1896)
 Vicente Gomez (1900-1903)
 Domingo Victoriano (1904-1905)
 Ceferino Legazpi (1908-1909)
 Isabello Mendoza (1910-1911)
 Catalino Cruz (1912–1918)
 Jesus Villalon (1926-1928)
 Wenceslao dela Paz (1929-1937)
 Juan Chanyungco (1938–1945)
 Enrique dela Paz (1945)
 Gil Estanislao Fernando (1946–1951)
 Juan Chanyungco (1952–1955)
 Gil Estanislao Fernando (1956–1959)
 Osmundo De Guzman (1960–1986)
 Teofisto Santos (1986)
 Rodolfo Valetino (1987–1992)
 Bayani Fernando (1992–2001)
 Maria Lourdes Fernando (2001–2010)
 Del De Guzman (2010–2016)
 Marcelino Teodoro	(2016–present)

City seal

The official seal of the City of Marikina bears the inscriptions "Lungsod ng Marikina", "Pilipinas", "1630" (the founding year of the municipality), and "1996", the year of approval of the city charter. The two mountains represent the majestic twin ranges of the Cordillera and Sierra Madre, between which the Marikina Valley is nestled, traversed by the Marikina River. The rising sun points to the eastern location of the city, with each ray representing the city's barangays. The machinery gear symbolizes its industries and the shoe last represents the traditional manufacturing in the city. The torch focuses on the lofty and noble ideals for human development and a better quality of life and is symbolic of its Hispanic culture and tradition. The bamboo underscores a mixture of the people's natural humility and strength of character and also emphasizes the city's transition from an agricultural past to the urbanized, industrial present; the leaves and branches symbolize order and serenity. The bamboo and the wheel represent Marikina and its people's respect for and protection of the environment so as to remain in harmony with progress.

Culture

Local cuisines such as Everlasting, a popular dish in Marikina similar to Embutido but it is cooked in "lyanera", while Waknatoy, a unique dish is simply a variant of Menudo with the addition of pickles which gives Waknatoy a sweet-tangy flavor, and Laoya, a dish similar to Nilaga with the addition of pounded garlic, sweet potato and saba banana.

Marikina's festivities are rich in culture, tradition, and the people themselves. Several ancestral houses can be found along J. P. Rizal Street in Barangay Santa Elena. Teatro Marikina is the center of the performing arts in Marikina. The traditional dance in Marikina is Lerion, the official folk dance of Marikina.

Some of the local festivities in Marikina include: Ilognayan Festival, a cultural event that is about letting the people know about the Marikina River's significance which is held in February along the Marikina River; Ka-Angkan Festival is a feast that coincides with the founding anniversary of Marikina on April 16. It is an event that honors the large native clans of the city that have unique monikers; Marikina Christmas Festival/Shopalooza/ChristmaSaya, is a long holiday festival filled with stalls selling a wide variety of goods at affordable prices. The festival starts as early as October, and runs until February of the following year, mostly concentrated in Marikina River Park and Riverbanks Center; Rehiyon-Rehiyon Festival, a festival that showcases the various ethnic groups that make up the people of Marikina. It serves as a tribute to the active community who came from other regions of the country and chose to settle in Marikina. It proves that unity can be achieved despite diverse backgrounds and different dialects. The festival celebrates every year on December 8, when Marikina was established as a city; and lastly, the Sapatos Festival, since Marikina was tagged as the Shoe Capital, the city celebrates the Sapatos Festival every year, from mid-September until the year ends. This is a celebration of the ingenuity and craftsmanship of shoemakers in Marikina. It gives due recognition to their hardship and the local shoe industry itself.

Sports

Marikina Sports Center, also known as Marikina Sports Park, located in the corner of Sumulong Highway and Shoe Avenue, is a prominent structure located in Marikina and a notable sports complex of the Philippines.

It features the football, and athletics stadium consisting of an athletics oval track, a 64 meters (210 ft) wide natural grass pitch, bicycle track, and two grandstands; the West and East Stands. The grandstands have a total seating capacity of 15,000 people. Between the West Stand and the athletics track, the basketball, volleyball, badminton, and tennis courts are located. The West Stand is situated along Shoe Avenue while the East Stand is connected to Marikina Sports Center indoor facilities such as an Olympic-size swimming pool inside an aquatics center which can accommodate 2,000 spectators, an 8-story sports building, an indoor gymnasium with a capacity of 7,000 seats, and other establishments such as sports and souvenir shops, food stalls and convenience stores.

The area has been host to several sports competitions both regional, national and international as well as entertainment such as grand concerts, finals night, live television shows, and other purposes. The sports complex is also home to the JPV Marikina F.C., a football club that currently plays in the Philippines Football League, the premier football league in the Philippines.

Transportation

Public transport and road networks
Public transportation within the city, like in most of the urban areas in the Philippines, is facilitated mostly using jeepneys and buses. Tricycles and pedicabs give access to more secluded areas, while taxicabs and a carpooling transport system are available throughout the city. FX taxis have begun to compete directly with jeepneys on major roads while UV Express transport services are also available in selected terminals. BFCT East Metro Transport Terminal located in Marikina–Infanta Highway-C5 Interchange near SM Marikina is a major public transport terminal east of Metro Manila. It is a part of decongesting the traffic in Metro Manila and other neighboring areas that offers interisland bus service destinations.

In January 2016, the city government of Marikina invented the "AMV" or "Adaptive Mobile Vehicle" for the PWD or Person with Disabilities and Senior Citizens. The "AMV" is a wheelchair vehicle or can put a wheelchair inside. The local government of Marikina wants to be a "friendly city" for the Senior Citizens. In the early 2000s, Marikina became one of the pioneers to promote a "bicycle-friendly" city to build bike lanes along major roads and city streets. The local government constructed a 66-kilometer network of bikeways to help reduce air pollution, greenhouse gas emissions, fuel consumption, and traffic congestion in the city. The bikeways project provides an estimated annual savings of 250 tons/km of carbon dioxide, 0.02 tons of particulate matter, and 0.13 tons of NOx. The World Health Organization awarded the project in 2008 in the category of climate change and health. In 2012, the longest bike lane during that time was opened along the stretch of the Marikina–Infanta Highway.

Marikina River is the main waterway in Marikina and used by local fisherfolk as a mode of river transport. River ferry terminals still not operational in the city due to the threat of overflowing water in the river during heavy downpours or typhoon season.

Road network

Marikina is accessed by the following major roads and thoroughfares:
 /R-6: Marikina–Infanta Highway (formerly Marcos Highway)
 : C-5 Access Road (FVR Road)
 Sumulong Highway
 A. Bonifacio Avenue
 J. P. Rizal Street
 Mayor Gil Fernando Avenue
 Shoe Avenue
 Bayan-Bayanan Avenue
 General Ordoñez Street
 Liwasan Kalayaan Street
 Eraño G. Manalo Street
 Major Dizon Street
 Bagong Farmers Avenue
 Champaca Street
 Lilac Street
 Katipunan Street
 Fortune Avenue

Bridges

Marikina is accessed by the following major bridges:
 Marikina Bridge (spans Marikina River)
 Marcos Bridge (spans Marikina River)
 President Diosdado Macapagal Bridge (spans Marikina River)
 SM Marikina Access Bridge (spans Marikina River)
 Gil Fernando Bridge (spans Marikina River)
 LRT Line 2 Bridge (spans Marikina River)
 Nangka Bridge (spans Nangka River)
 Barangka Flyover

Water transport
The Marikina River ferry service was to begin operation with the opening of the Riverbanks and Sta. Elena ferry stations in 2008, but due to the onslaught of Tropical Storm Ketsana in 2009 and heavy rainfalls and storms the following years that caused the river to overflowed, the ferry service was canceled and ceased operation. Recently, the Metropolitan Manila Development Authority is looking into plans of extending the Pasig River Ferry Service route to reach Marikina River and give commuters on the eastern side of Metro Manila an alternative and faster mode of transportation but it still undergoing vehicular planning.

Rail transport

The LRT Line 2 runs through the city, operated by the Light Rail Transit Authority. The current elevated light rail metro stations in use are Santolan station between the border of Barangay Calumpang in Marikina and Barangay Santolan in Pasig, and Marikina–Pasig station in Barangay San Roque, both are located on the stretch of Marikina–Infanta Highway. These stations connect to the west-end, Recto station in the City of Manila, and connect to the east-end terminus, Antipolo station in Antipolo, Rizal.

The following light rail metro stations in the city:

Line 2 (with 2 stations)
  Santolan
  Marikina-Pasig

MRT Line 7 Katipunan Spur Line

Plans were also laid out for a  additional spur line, known as the MRT Line 7 Katipunan Spur Line, that aims to connect the line from MRT-7 Tandang Sora station to the east of Metro Manila. The proposed spur line will traverse in Marikina through Andres Bonifacio Avenue, Sumulong Highway, and Mayor Gil Fernando Avenue.

Line 7 (with 3 proposed stations)
  Riverbanks
  Sumulong
  Emerald–Marikina (connected to Line 2)

Old Marikina Line (Rosario-Montalban branch)

The Manila Railroad Company (now Philippine National Railways) beforehand a line to Montalban (now Rodriguez, Rizal) traversing Marikina with the main station and three flag stations in Santo Niño, Bayan-Bayanan, and Nangka, started its operation in 1906. Currently, there is a road named "Daangbakal", also called by the present names of "Shoe Avenue Extension", "Munding Avenue" and "Bagong Silang", these roads are formerly the old tracks of Marikina Line from Tramo (now Rosario, Pasig) traversing Marikina connected up to San Mateo and ended in Montalban. In 1936, passenger operations ceased and after World War II, the line and its stations totally abandoned.

Proposed cable car system
The Manila Urban Cable Car project plans to pilot a  alignment following the Marikina River profile. The proposed line will connect the Santolan station and the planned MRT-4 along Ortigas Avenue Extension in Pasig. In Marikina, from LRT-2 Santolan Station, the cable line passes through Barangay Calumpang, and Barangay Industrial Valley between FVR Road and Marikina River before heading to Eastwood City area and Pasig City. The planned cable car system would have a detachable gondola lift with enclosed 10-seater cabins. Based on the project briefer, there will be around 180 cabins. End-to-end travel time is estimated to be around 16 minutes.

Manila Urban Cable Car System (with 1 proposed station):
 LRT-2 Santolan-Marikina

Public services and utilities

Health facilities

Marikina Health Office is a center of health services in the city and responsible for providing healthcare services as well as planning and implementation of the health care programs provided by the city government. It operates health centers and lying-in clinics of each barangay to provide basic medical services in the community.

Amang Rodriguez Memorial Medical Center is a major public hospital in Marikina and one of the largest medical facilities in the east of Metro Manila and Rizal Province, while Marikina Valley Medical Center, St. Vincent General Hospital, Garcia General Hospital, St. Anthony Medical Center, and Marikina Doctors Hospital and Medical Center (located in Santolan), are some of the major private hospitals.

Safety and security
Marikina Rescue 161 is a 24-hour emergency service that responds to all calls within the city for assistance during emergency situations in 5 minutes. The office also conducts seminars and training on first-aid among its staff to upgrade skills especially Marikina is vulnerable to calamities like floods, fire, and earthquakes.

Marikina Police Station is responsible for law enforcement, under the Eastern Police District (EPD) of National Capital Region Police Office (NCRPO) of the Philippine National Police (PNP).

Marikina Fire Department provides fire and emergency services, under Fire District IV (FD4) known as the Eastern District Fire of Bureau of Fire Protection National Capital Region (BFPNCR) of Department of the Interior and Local Government (DILG).

Education

Pamantasan ng Lungsod ng Marikina (PLMar) is the first city government-funded university to offer different courses while Marikina Polytechnic College (MPC) is a city-state technical college that offers mostly technical courses, both are government-owned institutions. FEU Roosevelt Marikina, a prominent college institution, is a private non-sectarian college named in honor of the American president Franklin D. Roosevelt and it is considered as the oldest academic institution in eastern Metro Manila.

Sectarian schools also offer college courses such as Mother of Divine Providence School, National Christian Life College and Our Lady of Perpetual Succor College (OLOPSC). Numerous campuses of information technology and computer colleges are also growing in the city. Technical Education and Skills Development Authority (TESDA) located near the city hall, is responsible for managing and supervising technical education and skills development in the city.

Marikina Science High School (MSHS), is the first city public science high school in Marikina. Marikina Catholic School is a private sectarian institution and it is considered as the city's center of Catholic educational institution located in Our Lady of the Abandoned Parish complex. Manila Boystown Complex, is a Manila city government-owned institution, the facility is exclusively for abandoned, forgotten, and voluntarily surrendered children, teenagers, and senior citizens.

Preschools, daycare centers, and numerous private schools for elementary and high school are scattered all over the city including Ingenium School and Charis School. Exclusive schools such as Marist School and St. Scholastica's Academy are also found in the city.

Each barangay in Marikina has at least one public primary or one public secondary school. A total of 17 primary public schools and 13 secondary public schools in the city is under the supervision of Department of Education's Division of City Schools Marikina.

Media
Marikina has its own radio station, the Radyo Marikina, which is a community radio station owned and operated by the city government. It is considered the first local government radio station in the Philippines. Its frequency is 1674 kHz in Metro Manila. The studio is located at the Public Information Office on the second floor of Marikina City Hall.

Life TV and Life Radio is owned and supervised by PMCC 4th Watch. Its studios are located at NCLC Building in Barangay Santo Niño. Life TV can be watched through BEAM TV nationwide digital television broadcast, in UHF Channel 50 and SkyCable channel 44.

Sister cities
Marikina has sister cities and friendship agreements with foreign and local cities. Also included neighbor cities.

See also
Giant shoes of Marikina
Legislative districts of Marikina
List of renamed cities and municipalities in the Philippines

References

External links

 
 [ Philippine Standard Geographic Code]

 
1630 establishments in the Philippines
Cities in Metro Manila
Populated places established in 1630
Populated places on the Marikina River
Highly urbanized cities in the Philippines